Lilian Rachel Greenwood (born 26 March 1966) is a British Labour Party politician serving as the Member of Parliament (MP) for Nottingham South since 2010, and the Opposition Deputy Chief Whip of the House of Commons since 2021.

A former union official, she served as the Shadow Secretary of State for Transport in Jeremy Corbyn's shadow cabinet from 2015 until her resignation in 2016, and as a shadow transport minister under opposition leader Ed Miliband from 2011 to 2015. On the back benches, Greenwood chaired the Transport Select Committee from 2017 to 2020, and the Commons Finance Committee from 2020 to 2021.

Early life and career
Greenwood was born on the 26 March 1966 in Bolton, Lancashire. She attended Canon Slade School, a local Church of England state secondary school, before attending St. Catharine's College, Cambridge.

Moving to Southwell, Nottinghamshire in 1999, Greenwood worked in the county for Unison, the public sector trade union, for 17 years.

Parliamentary career
Greenwood was selected as the Labour Party candidate for the 2010 general election after the incumbent Labour MP, Alan Simpson, announced in 2007 that he would not stand for re-election. She was elected as the MP with 37.3% of the vote, a margin of 4.4% over her closest rival.

Shortly after her election, she joined the Transport Select Committee, and was subsequently appointed as an assistant opposition whip. In late September 2011, she was promoted by Labour leader Ed Miliband to the role of Shadow Minister for Rail, a position she held up to her re-election at the 2015 general election.

Following the election of Jeremy Corbyn as Leader of the Labour Party, on 14 September 2015 she was promoted to the Shadow Cabinet as the Shadow Secretary of State for Transport.

Greenwood resigned from the Shadow Cabinet in the aftermath of the 2016 EU referendum, among with dozens of her colleagues, in protest against what she saw as Jeremy Corbyn's weak leadership. She supported Owen Smith in the failed attempt to replace Jeremy Corbyn in the 2016 Labour Party leadership election.

As a backbencher, Greenwood has chaired the Transport Select Committee and the Commons Finance Committee, and sat on the Liaison Committee, Education Select Committee and Regulatory Reform Committee.

She was re-elected at the 2017 and 2019 General Elections, and backed Lisa Nandy in the 2020 Labour Party leadership election.

On 14 February 2020, Greenwood self-quarantined herself after learning that she and Alex Sobel, another Labour MP, had attended a conference eight days earlier where a confirmed COVID-19 pandemic case had also been in attendance.

Greenwood returned to the opposition front bench in May 2021, when she was appointed by Labour leader Keir Starmer as the Opposition Deputy Chief Whip of the House of Commons for legislation, succeeding Alan Campbell following his promotion to Chief Whip.

References

External links

|-

1966 births
Living people
Alumni of St Catharine's College, Cambridge
Trade unionists from Nottinghamshire
Female members of the Parliament of the United Kingdom for English constituencies
Labour Party (UK) MPs for English constituencies
People from Bolton
People from Southwell, Nottinghamshire
Politicians from Nottingham
UK MPs 2010–2015
UK MPs 2015–2017
UK MPs 2017–2019
UK MPs 2019–present
English women trade unionists
21st-century British women politicians
21st-century English women
21st-century English people